In grammar, denominal verbs are verbs derived from nouns. Many languages have regular morphological indicators to create denominal verbs.

English
English examples are to school, from school, meaning to instruct; to shelve, from shelf, meaning to put on shelves; and to symbolize, from symbol, meaning to be a symbol for.

Some common denominalizing affixes in English are -ize/-ise (e.g., summarize), -ify (e.g., classify), -ate (e.g., granulate), en- (e.g., enslave), be- (e.g., behead), and zero or -∅ (e.g., school).

A variety of semantic relations are expressed between the base noun X and the derived verb. Although there is no simple relationship between the affix and the semantic relation, there are semantic regularities that can define certain subclasses.  Some common terms used to refer to these subclasses include:  
 resultative: to make something into an X, e.g., victimize, cash
 locative: to put something in X, e.g., box, hospitalize
 instrumental: to use X, e.g., sponge, hammer
 ablative: to remove something from X, e.g., deplane, unsaddle
privative: to remove X from something, e.g., pit (olives), behead, bone, defrost
 ornative: to add X to something or to cover something with X, e.g., rubberize, salt
 similative: to act like or resemble X, e.g., tyrannize, guard
 performative: to do or perform X, e.g., botanize, tango

Rgyalrong
In Rgyalrong languages, denominal derivations are extremely developed and have given rise to incorporating and antipassive constructions (Jacques 2012, 2014).

Latin
Many Latin verbs are denominal. For example, the first conjugation verb nominare (to name) is derived from nomen (a name), and the fourth conjugation verbs mollire (to soften) derive from mollis (soft).

See also
Deverbal noun, where the noun is formed from the verb.

References

Verb types

wa:Sivierba